Functional imaging (or physiological imaging) is a medical imaging technique of detecting or measuring changes in metabolism, blood flow, regional chemical composition, and absorption.

As opposed to structural imaging, functional imaging centers on revealing physiological activities within a certain tissue or organ by employing medical image modalities that very often use tracers or probes to reflect spatial distribution of them within the body. These tracers are often analogous to some chemical compounds, like glucose, within the body. To achieve this, isotopes are used because they have similar chemical and biological characteristics. By appropriate proportionality, the nuclear medicine physicians can determine the real intensity of certain substance within the body to evaluate the risk or danger of developing some diseases.

Modalities
 Positron emission tomography (PET)
 Fludeoxyglucose for Glucose metabolism
 O-15 as a flow tracer
 Single-photon emission computed tomography (SPECT)
 Computed tomography (CT) perfusion imaging
 Functional magnetic resonance imaging (fMRI)
 BOLD
 Diffusion MRI
 Perfusion (blood flow)
 Arterial spin labeling MRI
 Blood volume
 Hyperpolarized carbon-13 MRI
 Functional photoacoustic microscopy (fPAM)
 Magnetic particle imaging (MPI)
 Optical imaging
 Near-infrared spectroscopy (NIRS)

See also
 Biomedical engineering
 Medical imaging
 PET-CT
 Radiology
 Functional neuroimaging

References

External links
 Scholarpedia Functional imaging
Medical imaging